Snooker at the 1968 Summer Paralympics consisted of a men's event. It was held at the Hayarkon Scouts Club, Tel Aviv from 5 to 12 November 1968.

There were eight competitors, from six countries: two each from Italy and Great Britain, and one each from Australia, Austria, the Republic of Ireland and Rhodesia.

Michael Shelton won the gold medal, as he had in 1964.

Medal summary

References 

1968 Summer Paralympics events
1968
Paralympics